"Speed Star" (stylized as SPEED STAR) is a song by Japanese pop rock duo Garnidelia. It was released as the unit's sixth single on June 14, 2017. It reached number 11 on Oricon and number 21 on Japan Hot 100. It was used as the theme song for the anime film The Irregular at Magic High School: The Movie – The Girl Who Summons the Stars.

Release
On 13 March 2017, Aniplex revealed in event at the Dengeki Game Festival 2017 event about more details of the anime film The Irregular at Magic High School: The Movie – The Girl Who Summons the Stars including the theme song "Speed Star" that would be sung by Garnidelia. The song was released as a single on 14 June 2020 on three edition; Regular edition, Limited edition and Limited anime edition. The single reached number 11 on Oricon, 21 on Japan Hot 100, and 3 on Japan Hot Animation with spent 6, 3 and 3 weeks respectively. The album version of this song, which use the intro in the music video, was featured in their third album "G.R.N.D.".

Music video
The music video for "Speed Star" was directed by Shin Okawa. The video features the duo with the bands playing the song in the studio, with sometimes the scene show MARiA and toku play in the outer space that show much star in the sky. Some scene feature MARiA dance with two of the girls. The music video sometimes use black and white effect, which refer to their second single.

Track listing
All tracks written by MARiA.

Regular edition

Limited edition

Limited anime edition

Personnel
Garnidelia
MARiA – vocals
toku  – music

Bands
Hiroshi Sekita - Bass
Takeo Kajiwara - Guitar
Mi-cyan        - Drums
Ayako Himata   - Violin & Viola

Production
Kimihiro Nakase, toku – recording
Satoshi Hosoi – mixer
Hiromichi Takiguchi – mastering

Charts

Release history

Notes

References

Garnidelia songs
2017 singles
MARiA
Anime songs
2017 songs